Virtual Hero is a Spanish animated television series produced by Zeppelin TV for Movistar+ based on the comic book trilogy of the same name created by Rubén "El Rubius" Doblas.

In September 2020, Movistar+ announced the cancellation of the series after two seasons.

Synopsis
Rubius is one of the 100 selected playtesters for the ORV, an experimental virtual reality device. Connected directly to his neuronal network, these glasses transport him to a computer game universe known as the Game Worlds. Little does Rubius know, it's all part of an evil plan hatched by Trollmask, the devious Master of the Game Worlds, who is holding the players hostage in this virtual setting so that they all witness his victory over Rubius. Alongside his allies Sakura, Zombirella, Slimmer and G4T0, this unlikely hero will take on the challenges of the Game Worlds to free the players from Trollmask's clutches.

Cast

Episode list

Season 1

Season 2

Reception
Virtual Hero has received mixed reviews among television critics. On a positive note, Alberto Cano wrote for eCartelera that Virtual Hero is "a series that, in spite of betting on elements already seen on the likes of Ready Player One or Spy Kids 3-D: Game Over, manages to build a varied, attractive universe with its own personality, resulting in a fresh, fun animated fiction that rises as a notable product for the young audience." On the negative side, Espinof dismissed the show as "a poor imitation of the shōnen genre" and "an animated fanzine with no pretension or quality".

References

Animated series based on comics
Spanish animated television series
2018 Spanish television series debuts
2020 Spanish television series endings
Movistar+ network series
Anime-influenced Western animated television series